Stomping gait (or sensory ataxia gait) is a form of gait abnormality.
It indicates involvement of posterior column.
Posterior column carries proprioception which is essential for coordination of motor movements.


Presentation
Uncoordinated walking

Conditions associated with a stomping gait
 Friedreich's ataxia
 Pernicious anemia
 Tabes dorsalis
 Peripheral neuropathy
 Spinal cord disease
 Multiple sclerosis

References

Gait abnormalities